Czernichów may refer to:
Czernichów, Kraków County in Lesser Poland Voivodeship (south Poland)
Czernichów, Proszowice County in Lesser Poland Voivodeship (south Poland)
Czernichów, Silesian Voivodeship (south Poland)
Polish name for Chernihiv, a town in Ukraine